There have been two Finnish formations called III Corps (III Armeijakunta, III AK):

 III Corps during the Winter War
 III Corps during the Continuation War